The M811 is an automatic, externally powered, single- or dual-fed cannon firing NATO standard 25 mm ammunition (25 × 137mm), designed by Nexter Systems (previously Giat Industries).

History

The M811 was first shown in June 1983. Its intended use is in an air-defence or direct-fire role, mounted on either naval or land platforms, replacing existing 20 mm cannon where applicable. The Model 811 has been installed for trial purposes on the Nexter Systems Vextra 8 × 8 technology demonstrator. The turret installation was also provisionally selected for installation on the French Army's Vehicule Blindé de Combat d'Infanterie (VBCI) 8 × 8 Infantry Fighting Vehicle (IFV).

Description
Operation of the Model 811 is by an external electric motor that drives a camshaft lying inside the receiver. This shaft has a spiral cam groove that engages with a lug on the bolt, so that as the shaft revolves, the bolt is moved back and forth. The shaft is also geared to the feed mechanism, so that feed is in strict synchronisation with the bolt's movements. A hang-fire safety device is provided. Fire modes are single shot, limited bursts or continuous bursts with a pre-selectable cyclic rate of fire at 125 or 400 rounds/min. The feed direction for the percussion-primed 25 × 137 ammunition can be either manually selected or remotely selected, through an electrical feeder selection device. The first round fired following selection comes from the belt that has just been selected. The external power feature can be used for maintenance and training using dummy rounds. The Model 811 can fire all NATO standard 25 × 137 ammunition. Current natures available from Nexter Munitions includes the following; High Explosive Incendiary Tracer (HEI-T), Target Practice (TP), Target Practice Tracer (TP-T), Armour-Piercing Discarding-Sabot Tracer (APDS-T) and Armour-Piercing Fin-Stabilised Discarding-Sabot Tracer (APFSDS-T). According to Nexter Systems, the accuracy of the Model 811 25 mm is such that all rounds fired will hit a 1.5 m diameter target at a range of 1,500 m.

Nexter Systems
Autocannon
Anti-aircraft guns of France
25 mm artillery